Toyota Field is a soccer-specific stadium in San Antonio, Texas, United States. Located next to Heroes Stadium, and adjacent to the STAR Soccer Complex and Morgan's Wonderland, the facility opened on April 13, 2013. The stadium is the home of San Antonio FC and has a capacity of 8,296 for soccer matches and 13,000 for concerts and festivals. The stadium was the home of the San Antonio Scorpions of the North American Soccer League until the team's dissolution following the 2015 season.  The stadium is expandable to 18,000+ seating capacity in three phases and is currently built to its Phase 1 design. Toyota Motor Corporation currently holds the sponsor naming rights for the facility.

History
Toyota Field was originally owned and operated by S.O.A.R. Inc., a non-profit organization founded by San Antonio philanthropist Gordon Hartman. During S.O.A.R. Inc.'s operation of the facility, all proceeds went to Morgan's Wonderland, which is across the street from the stadium. Hartman also started Soccer For A Cause, a community-wide effort to bring pro soccer to San Antonio in order to help fund the operation of Morgan’s Wonderland. This led to Hartman’s acquisition of the San Antonio Scorpions in 2010, with the team starting play in the 2012 season.

Construction of Toyota Field ran from February 2012 through April 2013. On April 13, 2013, the Scorpions started play at Toyota Field in a NASL match against the Tampa Bay Rowdies with a 0–2 defeat. The team had played at nearby Heroes Stadium during construction.

Toyota Field was host of Soccer Bowl 2014, where the Scorpions claimed their first and only NASL championship over the Fort Lauderdale Strikers, 2–1.

Acquisition by City and County 
In November 2015, the City of San Antonio and Bexar County jointly acquired the stadium for $18 million. Spurs Sports & Entertainment (SS&E) paid an additional $3 million to Hartman, bringing the total purchase price of the facility to $21 million. SS&E received an initial 20-year lease to operate the facility with a new professional soccer team, with penalty fees of up to $5 million should the organization not bring a Major League Soccer franchise after the first six years. Toyota Field is host to San Antonio's USL franchise, San Antonio FC, who started play in March 2016.

Design
Toyota Field was designed by San Antonio architecture firm, Pro Sports Developments (PSD), which is the sports entertainment division of Luna Architecture and Design.  The stadium was designed as a soccer-specific stadium, to strategically expand to upwards of 18,000 seats in 3 total phases and to accommodate UIL, NCAA, MLS and FIFA standard international soccer events. The design also accommodates rugby, lacrosse, American football, boxing and concerts. The stadium currently exists as Phase 1 in the stadium expansion phases.

The stadium currently has a capacity of 8,296 seats, including 16 private suites, 864 midfield club seats, a field level beer garden for over 200 fans with tiered table and chair seating as close as 15 feet behind the south goal. A suite level observation terrace for over 100 fans overlooks the entire field, plus a fan zone behind the north-end seating allows fans to gather and get autographs before and after a game. The stadium capacity could reach approximately 9,000 spectators with standing-room only accommodations.

The architectural design by PSD reflects the industrial heritage of the historic Longhorn Quarry which the stadium now resides in. The stadium contains ribbed metal and perforated metal facades with exposed structural elements throughout the facility, accentuating the steel and creating a contemporary industrial feel. The metal façades and the metal roof canopy that extends over the west side suite balconies and stadium seating, together amplify the crowd noise. The permanent west side roof canopy combined with lower bowl stadium seating that starts only 17 feet from the soccer touchlines gives Toyota Field an intimate feel, a quality the designers say will continue with the future expansion phases as planned.

Field
The soccer field playing surface was designed and built by sports field contractor Texas Multi-Chem, of Kerrville. The field's natural grass surface is TifSport hybrid Bermuda and the root zone consists of an 8" layer of USGA sand and Dakota peat. The field also contains an internal drainage system to help avoid rain outs.

Sports

Soccer 

The Scorpions played their first game at Toyota Field on April 13, 2013 against the Tampa Bay Rowdies, losing 2–0.

On May 21, 2013, Toyota Field hosted its first Lamar Hunt U.S. Open Cup match between the Scorpions versus FC Tucson of the PDL.

On July 6, 2013, Toyota Field hosted its first international friendly match between the Scorpions versus Tigres UANL of Liga MX.

On October 13, 2013, Toyota Field hosted Santos Laguna versus Club Tijuana, both of Liga MX, in a friendly match.

On December 6–7, 2013, Toyota Field hosted the NCAA Division III Men’s Soccer Championship and the NCAA Division III Women's Soccer Championship.

Rugby union 

On March 30, 2019, Toyota Field hosted the Austin Elite and Rugby United New York of Major League Rugby. Rugby United New York would win 19-11 in front of 1,000 fans.

See also
 List of sports venues with the name Toyota

References

External links
 Official site
 Stadium pictures

San Antonio Scorpions
Austin Gilgronis
USL Championship stadiums
North American Soccer League stadiums
Soccer venues in Texas
Sports venues in San Antonio
Multi-purpose stadiums in the United States
Spurs Sports & Entertainment
San Antonio FC
Rugby union stadiums in Texas
Major League Rugby stadiums
2013 establishments in Texas
Sports venues completed in 2013